Nahitan Michel Nández Acosta (born 28 December 1995) is a Uruguayan professional footballer who plays as a midfielder for  club Cagliari and the Uruguay national team.

After starting his career at Peñarol, he later played in Argentina for Boca Juniors and in Italy for Cagliari. A full international for Uruguay since 2015, he played at the 2018 FIFA World Cup and the 2019 and 2021 Copa América.

Club career
Born in Punta del Este, Nández is a youth exponent from Peñarol. On 1 March 2014, he made his first team debut in a Uruguayan Primera División game against Danubio, replacing Antonio Pacheco D'Agosti after 57 minutes in a 0–2 away win.

On 23 August 2017, Nández moved to Argentina's Boca Juniors on a four-year deal, with the club paying US$4 million for 60% of his economic rights.

He made his last appearance for Boca Juniors on 31 July 2019 against Club Athletico Paranaense in a 2–0 home win. He was replaced by Eduardo Salvio in the 75th minute.

On 9 August 2019, Nández joined Italian club Cagliari Calcio on a five-year deal, for a fee of US$20 million.

International career
Nández was the captain and a key member of the Uruguayan team at the 2015 FIFA U-20 World Cup played in New Zealand, where he was in the starting eleven for all four of their games.

Nández made his  senior international debut on 8 September 2015, in a 1–0 friendly loss away to Costa Rica at the  Estadio Nacional; he replaced Diego Rolan in the 37th minute.

In June 2018 he was named in Uruguay's 23-man squad for the 2018 FIFA World Cup in Russia. He played in all five of their games as they reached the quarter-finals, starting all but one.

Nández was also called up by manager Óscar Tabárez for the 2019 Copa América in Brazil.

Career statistics

Club

International

Honours
Peñarol
 Uruguayan Primera División: 2015–16

Boca Juniors
 Argentine Primera División: 2017–18
 Supercopa Argentina: 2018

References

Living people
1995 births
People from Punta del Este
Uruguayan footballers
Association football midfielders
Peñarol players
Boca Juniors footballers
Cagliari Calcio players
Uruguayan Primera División players
Argentine Primera División players
Serie A players
Serie B players
Uruguay under-20 international footballers
Uruguay international footballers
Uruguayan expatriate footballers
Expatriate footballers in Argentina
Uruguayan expatriate sportspeople in Argentina
Expatriate footballers in Italy
Uruguayan expatriate sportspeople in Italy
2018 FIFA World Cup players
2019 Copa América players
2021 Copa América players